Amir Ali Majid is a former judge, legal scholar and author born in Gojra, Punjab, Pakistan.

Biography 
He was in his second year at University of Agriculture, Faisalabad when he lost his sight. Nevertheless, he went on to receive his B.A., LL.B., LL.M., as well as diplomas in Air and Space Law and International Law.

He is the first blind person in the world to become a Doctor of Civil Law (McGill University).  In addition, he is a member of the Higher Education Academy. He sat as a First-tier Immigration Judge for a number of years. In 2018 he was heavily criticised by a panel of Upper Tribunal judiciary as to certain "shambolic" judgments of his which were consequently set aside for very serious errors of law.

His other accomplishments include:
Reader in international law, London Metropolitan University
Part-time immigration judge, until he resigned on 7 December 2017 following extensive criticism of his legal ability (see Criticism, below)  
Adjunct professor in law, Webster University 
Visiting professor (1996), Quaid-e-Azam University
Senior research fellow (2001), Islamabad Policy Research Institute
Erasmus Lecturer, 2003, Frankfurt, Germany

He has published one book, newspaper articles and 35 articles in British, German, Dutch, and American journals.

In 2003, he met with Pakistan's president Pervez Musharraf to discuss disability rights in the country.

Recognition
 In 2003 he received the Sitara-i-Imtiaz (Star of Distinction), the second highest civilian honour in Pakistan.
 He was granted the Life Learning Award by the Kashmir and Pakistan Professionals Association on 17 July 2005.

Criticism
 As first a First-Tier UK immigration tribunal Judge his judgements have received an unprecedented level of criticism from the Upper Tribunal questioning his competency and knowledge of the law:...there is a virtue in brevity. But the basic requirements of a judicial decision must be met in all cases. It is necessary to set out sufficient of the facts to give a context to the dispute; sufficient of the evidence and submissions to show what the dispute was; findings on any disputed material fact and sufficient and adequate reasons for those findings; and adequate reasons for the conclusion, derived from the facts and the applicable legal rules. In the decisions under appeal before us it is not easy to find even one of those basic requirements being met. The reasons given are not proper, intelligible or accurate. The failures amount to errors of law. ...We regard the body of his work that we have examined in the course of these appeals as wholly failing to meet the standards that are demanded ...every one of the decisions under appeal shows error of law, in most cases serious error, in most cases multiple serious errors. Whether the decisions are looked at together or separately, they show that nobody should assume that Judge Majid has an adequate knowledge of the law or of his task as a judge...

References

External links
Journal of Legal Technology Risk Management biography

Blind lawyers
Living people
Pakistani lawyers
Recipients of Sitara-i-Imtiaz
People from Toba Tek Singh District
Pakistani blind people
McGill University Faculty of Law alumni
Year of birth missing (living people)
Pakistani emigrants to the United Kingdom
University of Agriculture, Faisalabad alumni
Blind academics